The Battle of Yeavering (or Battle of Geteryne) was fought in 1415 between English and Scottish forces near Yeavering in Northumberland.  A small English force consisting of 440 men led by the Earl of Westmoreland defeated 4000 Scots.  Fought in the same year as the Battle of Agincourt, which famously demonstrated the efficacy of the longbow against cavalry, it is notable that the English side at Yeavering consisted mostly of archers.

The site is marked by a battle stone, probably originally a Bronze Age standing stone.

See also
 Battle of Humbleton Hill

References

Yeavering
1415 in England
Yeavering
Yeavering
1415 in Scotland
Kirknewton, Northumberland